"Pretty in Scarlet" is a 2003 song by Guano Apes, released as the second single from their third album Walking on a Thin Line on 23 April 2003. The music video shows Sandra as a rich person who gets attraction from the other members in her mansion.

Track listing

CD single
Pretty in Scarlet (Single Version) - 3:38
You Can't Stop Me (G-Ball Remix) - 4:58
Pretty in Storm (G-Ball Remix) - 3:46
Pretty in Scarlet (Album Version) -4:02
CD-ROM material
Pretty in Scarlet - 4:16
Pretty in Scarlet (Making Of) - 8:57

CD single 2
Pretty in Scarlet (Single Version) - 3:38
You Can't Stop Me (G-Ball Remix) - 4:58
Pretty in Scarlet (Album Version) - 4:02

CD single 3
Pretty in Scarlet (Single Version) - 3:39
You Can't Stop Me (G-Ball Remix) - 4:59
Pretty in Scarlet (Album Version) - 4:02
CD-ROM material
Pretty in Scarlet - 4:16
Pretty in Scarlet (Making Of) - 8:57

Promo single
Pretty In Scarlet (Radio Edit) - 3:39
Pretty In Scarlet (Album Version) - 4:07

Charts

Credits
Multimedia Part Concept & Design – Friedel Muders
Composed By – Guano Apes
Engineer – Clemens Matznick
Lyrics By – Sandra Nasic
Mixed By – Clemens Matznick
Percussion – Roland Peil
Producer – Fabio Trentini, Guano Apes
Producer [Additional Vocal] – Artemis Gounaki, Sandra Nasic

References

2003 singles
Guano Apes songs
Rock ballads
Pop ballads
Songs about death